Arthur John Arberry (12 May 1905, in Portsmouth – 2 October 1969, in Cambridge) FBA was a British scholar of Arabic literature, Persian studies, and Islamic studies.  He was educated at Portsmouth Grammar School and Pembroke College, Cambridge. His English translation of the Qur'an, The Koran Interpreted, is popular amongst academics worldwide.

Academic career
Arberry served as Head of the Department of Classics at Cairo University in Egypt.  He eventually returned home to become the Assistant Librarian at the Library of the India Office. During the Second World War he was a Postal Censor in Liverpool and was then seconded to the Ministry of Information, which was housed in the newly constructed Senate House of the University of London. Arberry held the Chair of Persian at the School of Oriental and African Studies SOAS, University of London, in 1944–47. He subsequently became the Sir Thomas Adams's Professor of Arabic at Cambridge University and a Fellow of Pembroke College, Cambridge, his alma mater, from 1947 until his death in 1969. He is buried in Ascension Parish, Cambridge, together with his wife Sarina Simons Arberry (1900-1973). She was Romanian by birth; Arberry first met her in Cairo and they married at Cambridge in 1932.

Arberry is also notable for introducing Rumi's works to the west through his selective translations and for translating the important anthology of medieval Andalusian Arabic poetry The Pennants of the Champions and the Standards of the Distinguished. His interpretation of Muhammad Iqbal's writings, edited by Badiozzaman Forouzanfar, is similarly distinguished.

Arberry also introduced to an English-speaking audience the work of Malta's national poet, Carmelo Psaila, popularly known as Dun Karm, in the bilingual anthology Dun Karm, Poet of Malta.

Works
 The Rubai'yat of Jalal Al-Din Rumi: Select Translations Into English Verse (Emery Walker, London, 1949)
 The Rubai'yat of Omar Khayyam. Edited from a Newly Discovered Manuscript Dated 658 (1259–60) in the Possession of A. Chester Beatty Esq. (Emery Walker, London, 1949) — unbeknown to Arberry or Alfred Chester Beatty, the "newly discovered manuscript" was a twentieth-century forgery. 
 Avicenna on Theology (London: John Murray, 1951)
 Omar Khayyam. A New Version, Based upon Recent Discoveries  (London: John Murray, 1952) — based upon the Beatty and another forged manuscript
The Secrets of Selflessness (John Murray, London, 1953)
 Moorish Poetry: A Translation of 'The Pennants', an Anthology Compiled in 1243 by the Andalusian Ibn Sa'id (University Press, Cambridge, 1953),
 The Koran Interpreted (Allen & Unwin, London, 1955)
 The Seven Odes: The First Chapter in Arabic Literature (Allen & Unwin, London, 1955)
Classical Persian Literature (1958)
 Dun Karm, poet of Malta. Texts chosen and translated by A.J. Arberry; introduction, notes and glossary by P. Grech. Cambridge University Press 1961.
 Muslim Saints and Mystics, A translation of episodes from the 'Tazkirat al-Awliya’ (Memorial of the Saints) originally written by Farid al-Din Attar (Routledge & Kegan Paul, London, 1966)
Javid Nama (Allen & Unwin, London, 1966)
 Discourses of Rumi, A translation of Fihi Ma Fihi, (Samuel Weiser, New York, 1972)
 Mystical Poems of Rumi, Translated by A. J. Arberry, (University of Chicago Press, 2009)

References

External links
 
 Arberry's English Quran Translation at the
 Online Quran Project
 Tanzil Project
 Arberry, Arthur John article at Encyclopædia Iranica

1905 births
1969 deaths
People educated at The Portsmouth Grammar School
Iqbal scholars
Translators of the Quran into English
British Islamic studies scholars
British Arabists
Iranologists
Arabic–English translators
Fellows of Pembroke College, Cambridge
Fellows of the British Academy
British orientalists
Alumni of Pembroke College, Cambridge
Academic staff of Cairo University
Rumi scholars
Academics of SOAS University of London
20th-century British translators
Writers from Portsmouth
Sir Thomas Adams's Professors of Arabic